2020 MUAHS Guild Awards
April 3, 2021

Contemporary: 

Birds of Prey (and the Fantabulous Emancipation of One Harley Quinn)

Period/Character:

Ma Rainey's Black Bottom
The 13th Make-Up Artists and Hair Stylists Guild Awards are presented by the Make-Up Artists and Hair Stylists Guild to honor the best make-up and hairstyling in film and television for 2020, the winners will be announced in a virtual ceremony on April 3, 2021 while the nominees were announced on February 18, 2021.

Winners and nominees

Feature-Length Motion Picture

Television Series, Limited or Miniseries or Television New Media Series

Television Special, One Hour or More Live Program  Series or Movie for Television

Daytime Television

Children and Teen Television Programming

Commercials and Music Videos

Theatrical Productions (Live Stage)

References

2020